Ryan Scott Wittman (born October 26, 1987) is a former American basketball player, best known for his college career at Cornell University.

Early life and high school career

Wittman was born on October 26, 1987, in Atlanta, Georgia. He is the son of Kathy and Randy Wittman and he has one sister, Lauren. Randy Wittman was formerly the head coach of the Washington Wizards and was previously head coach of the Cleveland Cavaliers (1999–2001) and Minnesota Timberwolves (2007–2008). The elder Wittman was a player on the 1980–81 Indiana Hoosiers men's basketball team which won a championship under Bob Knight. Drafted 22nd overall in the 1983 NBA Draft, Wittman played for NBA teams Atlanta Hawks, Sacramento Kings, and Indiana Pacers for nine seasons.

Ryan Wittman was born in Atlanta, when his father was a member of the Atlanta Hawks,  but grew up in Eden Prairie, Minnesota and occasionally played pick-up games with Kevin Garnett at the Target Center. Wittman attended Eden Prairie High School, where he posted an average of 11.5 points per game in his junior year. He was named one of the preseason Top 30 players in Minnesota for the Class of 2006 by GopherIllustrated.com.

In July 2005, Wittman played for the AAU team Minnesota Select. The team was 5–1 in the Las Vegas Classic, an AAU playoff tournament. He led Select scorers with 15 points in a quarterfinal loss to the Houston Hoops, 59–53. Their season record was 27–14.

As a senior, his points per game average exploded to 20.5, and he hit 50 percent of his shots from three-point range and 84 percent from the foul line. One of the highlights of that season was upsetting Braham High School on December 30, 2005, who had a 65-game unbeaten streak snapped by the 80–67 loss to the Eagles. Wittman scored 30 points in that contest, including five-of-six from beyond the arc. After the season was over, Wittman was one of the five finalists for Minnesota Mr. Basketball and was listed as the sixth best Minnesota high school player by GopherIllustrated.com. In addition to being selected onto the First Team All Metro, he was a First Team All-State selection by the Timberwolves and a Second Team All-State selection by the St. Paul Pioneer Press.

He was recruited by Air Force, Bradley, Cornell, Eastern Kentucky, and Indiana. Cornell, which had recruited Wittman since his junior year in high school, was unable to offer him an athletic scholarship due to Ivy League rules. Nonetheless, Wittman inked his letter of intent to the Big Red on December 31, 2005.

College career
In Wittman's first collegiate game, he broke the Cornell record for most points in a freshman collegiate opener with 18 points, also finishing with three rebounds and two assists. That game, a 64-61 road win against Northwestern, was Cornell's first victory against a Big Ten school in 39 years. At Cornell, Wittman was a member of the Quill and Dagger society.

Professional career
He played in four games for the Celtics in the Orlando Summer League and then three games for the New York Knicks in the NBA Summer League.

In the 2010 season, he played six months in Italy for the Fulgor Libertas Forlì, then he went in D-League at the Fort Wayne Mad Ants.

In the 2011 season he played for the Zastal Zielona Góra.

Statistics

NCAA

See also
List of NCAA Division I men's basketball career 3-point scoring leaders

References

External links
Boston College coaching bio
D-League statistics
Ryan Wittman at Ivy League Basketball News - Ryan Wittman tag at unofficial news site featuring video archives & news links

1987 births
Living people
American expatriate basketball people in Italy
American expatriate basketball people in Poland
American men's basketball players
Basket Zielona Góra players
Basketball players from Minnesota
Basketball players from Georgia (U.S. state)
Cornell Big Red men's basketball players
Fort Wayne Mad Ants players
Fulgor Libertas Forlì players
People from Eden Prairie, Minnesota
Small forwards
Sportspeople from the Minneapolis–Saint Paul metropolitan area